Terra Lliure ("Free Land"), sometimes referred to as TLL, was a Catalan nationalist paramilitary group. Formed in 1978, the group carried out hundreds of attacks that left many people injured and five dead (four of them members of the organization after the explosion of the artifact they were manipulating in three separate incidents).

Terra Lliure, became known to the public with a protest at a mass meeting at the Camp Nou stadium in Barcelona in 1981. An important police raid in 1991 and the renunciation of violence by some of the group members led to the dissolution of Terra Lliure in 1995. After disbanding, many members joined the political party Republican Left of Catalonia. During the most active period of its activity it was considered a terrorist organization by Spanish and European courts, Spanish press, and at least parts of the Catalan press.

History

1978–1990

Most of Terra Lliure's original members converged into the group around 1980, arriving from other armed organizations such as the Catalan People's Army (EPOCA), the Catalan Liberation Front (FAC) or political organizations such as the Socialist Party of National Liberation (PSAN) and Catalan Countries' Independentists. In 1979, Terra Lliure started its armed activities and two of its members died that year, one in a shootout with Civil Guard members and another one blew up himself.

In May 1981, Terra Lliure kidnapped journalist Federico Jiménez Losantos, shot him in the leg and set him free. He was targeted due to signing and promoting a manifesto commenting on the Catalan nationalist menace to the Spanish language in Catalonia. In June, the group published its first statement, called Free Land Calling, in a mass meeting at the Camp Nou stadium.

In 1982, Terra Lliure held its first assembly, while it continued its armed campaign against Spanish and French interests, bank offices and other administrations. A second assembly was held in 1984 and the group started publishing official statements and claimed actions that they carried out through the Alerta magazine. In 1985 and 1985, two more members died while carrying explosive devices.

Between 1984 and 1989 some of Terra Lliure's leaders were arrested, nevertheless the group maintained its structure and capacities and a parallel political movement was developing, the Solidarity Committee with the Catalan Patriots (CSPC) and the Movement for the Defense of the Land (MDT). In 1987, the group committed its only killing, with a bomb attack in Les Borges Blanques, Lleida. Terra Lliure admitted the killing was an error. The group also committed several attacks, mainly against American interests, together with the Catalan Red Liberation Army. In 1988, Terra Lliure held its third assembly and developed three documents to describe the theoretical framework and analyze the social reality of the Catalan National Liberation Movement.

1991–1995
In July 1991, Terra Lliure announced it was declaring a ceasefire and that some of its members would start joining the Republican Left of Catalonia. Despite that, some cells kept carrying out attacks, especially due to the proximity to the Olympic Games in Barcelona in 1992. Also in 1991, a former member of Terra Lliure, who had joined ETA, was killed in a police raid after a bomb attack in Vic, Barcelona.

In July 1992, under an order of judge Baltasar Garzón, police arrested around 40 of members of the group. Years later, the European Court of Human Rights ordered the Spanish government to compensate some of the arrested people for failing to investigate allegations of torture during the raid. The following years, the group did not commit any attack and announced its dissolution on the 1995 National Day of Catalonia.

Attacks

1979 

January 26: Martí Marcó is shot dead by Spanish police at a checkpoint in Barcelona city center.
June 1: Fèlix Goñi is killed in Barcelona as the bomb he was carrying explodes prematurely.

1980 

July 25: first attacks claimed by Terra Lliure, with two bomb explosions in Fecsa-Endesa offices in Barcelona and Calella.
September 10: two bomb attacks target the Provincial Education Delegation and the ENHER offices building at the Gràcia district of Barcelona.

1981 

January 2: bomb attacks against Fecsa-Endesa offices in Barcelona and Lleida and against an electricity pylon in Prat de Llobregat.
April 12: bomb attacks against FECSA office in Terrassa and against a Pirelli factory in Vilanova i la Geltrú.
May 21: Jiménez Losantos is kidnapped in Santa Coloma de Gramanet. After a few hours, he is released with a shot in the leg as a reprisal for his activities against the public use of Catalan language. 
May 30: bomb attack against a transmission station of the Spanish TV in Montserrat, the night before Fuerzas Armadas (Spanish army) day. 
June 24: bomb attacks against FECSA offices in Girona, Salou and Reus. Bomb attack against an electric transformer station.
September 9: bomb attacks against the Spanish treasury's office and the Spanish state labor office in Barcelona, the Spanish treasury's in Tarragona and the Spanish state delegations in València and Alacant.
October 9: bomb attack against an excavator property of Exmop SA at Pedraforca mountain. Bomb attacks against the Spanish education ministry office and the Spanish courts in Valencia.
October 29: bomb attacks against the provincial government office in Lleida and against Montepio Laboral savings bank and the Spanish courts in Barcelona.
November 9: bomb attack against Guardia Civil barracks in Terrassa.

1982 

January 23: bomb attacks against FECSA premises in Cornellà and Sant Cugat del Vallès.
February 25: bomb attack against Guardia Civil barracks at Alcover.
May 1: bomb attack against the Spanish state labor office in Girona. 
May 22: bomb attack against Guardia Civil barracks in Vallvidrera which results in two wounded Guardia Civil agents. 
May 30: bomb attack against Spanish employment service offices in Sant Feliu de Llobregat.
July: bomb attacks against ENHER and FECSA offices at Barcelona and Mollet del Vallès.
September 2: bomb attack against ICONA offices in Barcelona.

1983 

April 20: bomb attack against Guardia Civil barracks in Sitges.
September 2: bomb attack against FECSA offices located in the Sants district of Barcelona.
September 7: mortar attacks against Guardia Civil barracks in Martorell and against a Spanish police station in Barcelona.
November 8: mortar attacks against the Spanish state delegation offices and against a Spanish police station in Barcelona. The station, in Casarmona, was the same one as in the previous month's attack.
November 12: bomb attack against the central Spanish courts in Valencia.
November 15: bomb attacks against two separate offices belonging to Hidroeléctrica Española in Valencia.
December 2: bomb attack against a FECSA office in the Sarrià district of Barcelona.

1984 

January 20: bomb attacks against two separate Spanish treasury offices in Barcelona.
January 21: bomb attack against a Spanish police station in the Gràcia district of Barcelona.
February 10: bomb attack against a FECSA office in the Sant Andreu district of Barcelona.
March 2: bomb attack against a Spanish police station near Barcelona's port. A patrol car and a police bus are destroyed as a result. 
April 20: bomb attack against a command office of the Spanish Navy in Castelldefels. The building is virtually destroyed by the blast. 
May 9: bomb attack against a Spanish state employment office in Valencia. 
May 12: bomb attacks against El Jardín and Primar bars in Barcelona. Both were involved in heroin trafficking. Another bomb attack against the courts of Barcelona.
May 13: shrapnel bomb attack against an office belonging to Hidroeléctrica Española in Sueca. 
May 21: parcel bomb against Pedro J. Lapeña, an extreme-right professor at Valencia University. 
May 30: bomb attack against a tax collection office in Valencia.
June 15: bomb attack against FECSA offices in the Sants district of Barcelona. 
June 26: bomb attacks against the Spanish public works ministry's offices in Valencia.
June 27: bomb attack against Spanish state employment offices in Valencia.
July 1: a bomb targeting ENHER offices in Barcelona is defused by the police. 
July 10: coordinated bomb attacks against FECSA offices in Sabadell, Molins de Rei, Terrassa, Sant Cugat del Valles, Martorell and Rubí. Another bomb attack hits offices belonging to Constructora Pirenaica SA in Barcelona. 
July 16: bomb attacks against Hidroeléctrica Española premises and against Spanish state employment offices in Torrent and against the Spanish labor ministry's offices in Barcelona.
July 18: bomb attacks against Spanish state employment offices in Quart de Poblet and against Spanish Navy premises in Tortosa. 
July 20: Terra Lliure member Josep Antoni Villaescusa dies in Alzira, Valencia after the premature explosion of the bomb he was about to plant in Spanish state employment offices. 
September 8: mortar attacks against Spanish state offices and a Spanish police station in Barcelona. This second attack fails. Another bomb attack targets Guardia Civil barracks in Santa Bàrbara.
November 2: bomb attacks against two Spanish state employment offices in Barcelona.
November 28: bomb attack against Guardia Civil barracks in Perelló.

1985 

February 14: bomb attack against Spanish state tax offices in Ripoll.
March 2: bomb attack against Citroën offices in Gràcia, Barcelona.
April 22: bomb attack against Spanish Television premises in Miramar. 
July 27: two bomb attacks against FECSA offices in Barcelona.
August 28: police defuse a bomb aimed at Spanish state employment offices in Barcelona.
August 31: bomb attack against Spanish state employment offices in Figueres.
September 3: bomb attack against Spanish state employment offices in Vilafranca del Penedès.
September 4: bomb attack against Spanish state employment offices in Barcelona.
September 6: police defuse a bomb aimed at Foment del Treball offices in Barcelona.
September 11: police defuse a booby trap next to the Spanish Naval Forces Command Center in Barcelona. 
September 17: armed Terra Lliure members assault far-right lawyer Gómez-Rovira's office in Barcelona, leaving behind an explosive device. 
October 30: police defuse a bomb aimed at Guardia Civil barracks in Canet de Mar.
November 29: bomb attacks against Spanish Police vehicles at Montjuïc, Barcelona.
December 6: bomb attacks against Spanish state employment offices and a Spanish police station in Barcelona. 
December 8: police defuse a bomb aimed at the Spanish state employment offices in Ripoll. 
December 16: bomb attack against a Spanish police station in Barcelona. Terra Lliure member Quim Sànchez dies as a result of the premature explosion of the device he was carrying.
December 17: bomb attack against Telefonica offices in Vilafranca del Penedès. 
December 18: bomb attack against a Spanish police vehicle in Barcelona.

1986 

January 7: bomb attack against Spanish state tax collection offices in Arenys de Mar.
January 8: bomb attack against Spanish courts in Blanes.
January 11: bomb attacks against Spanish state tax collection offices in Mataró and against state employment offices in Barcelona.
February 28: bomb attack against Sanyo premises in Barcelona.
March 5: double bomb attack against an army cultural center in Barcelona.

1987 
 January 18: bomb attack against offices of Banco Hispano Americano in Barcelona.
 February 10: bomb attack against state tax collection offices in Via Laietana, Barcelona.
 September 10: bomb attack against the Court in Borjas Blancas. As a result of the terrorist attack dies Emilia Aldomà i Sans.
 December 26: claimed responsibility on a bombing at Bar Iruna in Barcelona which killed an American sailor.

1988 
 August 16: bomb attack against the building of the Ministerio de Obras Públicas y Urbanismo in Girona
 September 6: attack against the Instituto Nacional de Empleo in Tarragona, causing the destruction of the building.

1989 
 February 27: bomb attack against state tax collection offices in Palma de Mallorca.
 September 11: bomb attack against a building of the Guardia Civil in Banyoles. As a result, two police officers are badly injured.

1990 
 February 7: bomb attack against Spanish Labor offices (INEM) in Girona.
 March 21: Terra Lliure's member Jordi Puig, badly injured after the explosive device he was handling in his car explodes in front of the building of the Law Court in Santa Coloma de Farnés.
 May 23: bomb attack against a reconstruction of the Santa María vessel (one of the three vessels used in Columbus' first trip to America) in Barcelona's harbor. The ships results badly damaged.

1991 
 May 10: bomb attack against the offices of Telefónica in Lleida.
 May 11: bomb attack against the offices of Telefónica in Girona.
 December 19: bomb attack against the Court building in Cervera.

1992 
 February 28: bomb attack against the Court building in Figueres.
 June 29: bomb attacks against offices in Barcelona and Girona.

See also
History of Spain
History of Catalonia

References

External links
Documentary made by Catalan channel TV3 about Terra Lliure 

Politics of Catalonia
Catalan independence movement
Secessionist organizations in Europe
National liberation movements
Left-wing militant groups in France
Left-wing militant groups in Spain
Far-left politics in France
Far-left politics in Spain
Separatism in France
Separatism in Spain
Resistance movements
Terrorism in France
Terrorism in Spain
Nationalist terrorism in Europe
Military wings of nationalist parties
Military wings of socialist parties
Military units and formations established in 1978
Military units and formations disestablished in 1995
Organisations designated as terrorist by the European Union
Defunct organizations designated as terrorist in Europe